The Schock 23 is an American trailerable sailboat, that was designed by Steven Schock, with a wing keel designed by Finnish engineer Reijo Salminen and first built in 1987.

Production
The boat was built by W. D. Schock Corp in Corona, California, United States, but it is now out of production. W. D. Schock Corp records indicate that they built 52 boats between 1987 and 1991.

Design

The Schock 23 is a small recreational keelboat, built predominantly of fiberglass, with wood trim. It has a masthead sloop rig, a transom-hung rudder and a fixed wing keel. It displaces  and carries  of ballast.

The boat is normally fitted with a small  outboard motor for docking and maneuvering.

The design has sleeping accommodation for four people, with a double "V"-berth in the bow cabin, one straight settee in the main cabin and one quarter berth aft under the companionway. The galley is located on the port side just forward of the companionway ladder. The galley is equipped with a single-burner stove and a sink. The head is located just aft of the bow cabin.

The boat has a PHRF racing average handicap of 201 with a high of 210 and low of 177.

Operational history
In a 2010 review Steve Henkel wrote, "the Schock 23 is the predecessor to Schock's Santana 2023, in which some components such as the stern configuration have been preserved (and are very similar to the stern on the Santana 23, designed for Schock in the late 1970s by Shad Turner) ... Best features: The cockpit has deep, well-angled, comfortable backrests. Opening Lewmar ports give good ventilation, and an optional poptop increases headroom in the main cabin to 5' 11". The Schock is fitted with a bolt-on winged keel designed by Finnish engineer Reijo Salminen. Sailing a Schock 25 with a standard deep fin keel against an identical hull fitted with the shallower winged keel, the Schocks found that light-air windward performance was about equal and the winged keel had the edge reaching and running. In heavier winds, the winged keel proved more effective than the standard fin on all points of sail. Worst features: Wings on a keel can pick up weed and jetsam, slowing the boat down."

See also
List of sailing boat types

Similar sailboats
Beneteau First 235
Bluenose one-design sloop
Hunter 23
O'Day 23
Paceship 23
Paceship PY 23
Precision 23
Rob Roy 23
Sonic 23
Stone Horse
Watkins 23

References

External links

Keelboats
1990s sailboat type designs
Sailing yachts
Trailer sailers
Sailboat type designs by Steven Schock
Sailboat types built by W. D. Schock Corp